This is a list of active aircraft of the Naval Aviation Command of the Navy of the Argentine Republic as of 2015 (2020/21 in case of P-3 and Super Etendard):

Aircraft

Notes

References 

Aircraft
Navy aircraft
Military equipment of Argentina